The 1989 Champions Trophy was held in Sharjah, UAE, between October 13-20, 1989. Three national teams took part: India, Pakistan and West Indies.

The 1989 Champions Trophy was a double round-robin tournament where each team played the other twice. Pakistan won the tournament by winning all four of their matches.

The beneficiaries of the tournament were Fazal Mahmood (Pakistan), Iqbal Qasim (Pakistan), Krishnamachari Srikkanth (India), Polly Umrigar (India) and Viv Richards (West Indies) who each received US$35,000 (£20,000).

Matches

Group stage

See also
 Sharjah Cup

References

 
 Cricket Archive: Champions Trophy 1989/90
 ESPNCricinfo: Champions Trophy, 1989/90
 

International cricket competitions from 1988–89 to 1991
Champions Trophy, 1989
1988 in Emirati sport
International cricket competitions in the United Arab Emirates